Slawharad or Slavgorod is a town in Mogilev Region, eastern Belarus. It is located in the east of the region, on the banks of the Sozh River at the confluence with the Pronya River, and serves as the administrative center of Slawharad District. As of 2009, its population was 7,992.

History
Slawharad was first mentioned in the chronicles in 1136 as Prupoy. It was also mentioned later under the names of Proposhensk, Propolsk, and Propoysk. 

In the 14th century, Propoysk became a part of the Grand Duchy of Lithuania, where it was a part of Mstsislaw Voivodeship. From 1569 to 1772, Propoysk, like the rest of the Grand Duchy of Lithuania, were part of the Polish–Lithuanian Commonwealth. Propoysk was badly damaged during the Russo-Polish War (1654–1667). In September 1772, as a result of the First Partition of Poland, the town was transferred to the Russian Empire and became a part of Mogilev Governorate. It was the center of Propoyskaya Volost of Bykhovsky Uyezd. 

As of 1881, the population of Propoysk was 3,400. In the 19th century, the town was one of major centers of iron production, however, the production stopped in 1872. It was also an important river port.

20th century 
In 1919, Mogilev Governorate was abolished, and Slawharad was transferred to Gomel Governorate. On 17 July 1924, the governorate was abolished as well, and Propoysk became the administrative center of Propoysk Raion, which belonged to Mogilev Okrug of Byelorussian Soviet Socialist Republic. On 15 January 1938, the raion was transferred to Mogilev Region. In January 1939, the population of Propoysk included 1,038 Jews, 22 percent of the total population. During the Second World War, the town was occupied by German troops and severely damaged. The Jews of the town were murdered in several operations in November 1941.

On May 23, 1945, Propoysk was renamed Slawharad (Slavgorod), and Propoysk Raion was renamed Slawharad Raion. In 1986, it was considerably affected by the Chernobyl disaster.

Economy

Industry

The industry in Slawharad produces food and serves local agriculture.

Transportation
The town is located on the highway connecting Roslavl in Russia with Bobruysk. There are also road connections with Mogilev, Chavusy, and Bykhaw.

Culture and recreation
The Propoysk Castle did not survive, but its location, the Castle Hill, between the Sozh and the Pronya, is an archaeological monument. There are several monuments of architecture which were built in the 18th and the 19th century. The most notable one is the Church of the Nativity of the Theotokos (1791–1793), located close to the Castle Hill.

References

External links
 
 The murder of the Jews of Slawharad during World War II, at Yad Vashem website.

Towns in Belarus
Populated places in Mogilev Region
Slawharad District
Radimichs
Mstislaw Voivodeship
Bykhovsky Uyezd
Holocaust locations in Belarus